Catarina Ykens-Floquet (1608 – after 1666), was a Flemish still life painter.

Biography
She was born in Antwerp as the daughter of Lucas Floquet and the sister of three painters. She married the painter Frans Ykens in 1635 and is known for fruit and flower still lifes, including flower garland paintings.
Her works are sometimes confused with the works of another Antwerp painter of the same name, Catarina Ykens, born in 1659, who was the daughter of Johannes Ykens and his second wife Barbara Brekevelt.

References

1608 births
Flemish Baroque painters
Flemish still life painters
Artists from Antwerp
Flemish women painters
17th-century women artists